Urduña/Orduña is an exclave and municipality of 4,232 inhabitants located in the province of Biscay, in the autonomous community of Basque Country, in the North of Spain.

Geography 
The municipality is an exclave of Biscay, surrounded entirely by the Basque province of Álava and the province of Burgos, part of Castile and León. It is located in a plain in the highest part of the Nervión river valley, at the foot of the Sierra Salbada mountains. The municipality contains the small exclave of Cerca de Villaño, surrounded by the neighbouring province of Burgos.

Orduña is the final station of the commuter rail line C-3 that links the town with Bilbao.

Notable people 
 Juan de Garay (1528–1583), conquistador, governor, founder of Buenos Aires and Santa Fe
 Alberto Alcocer y Ribacoba (1886–1957), politician, mayor of Madrid and secretary general of the Bank of Spain
 Iván Fandiño (1980–2017), bullfighter

References

External links 
 http://www.orduna.org: Local 
 ORDUÑA in the Bernardo Estornés Lasa - Auñamendi Encyclopedia (Euskomedia Fundazioa) 
 Apuntaciones históricas de la Ciudad de Orduña. José Antonio de Armona y Murga, 1789 

Municipalities in Biscay
Enclaves and exclaves